Joel Swetow (born January 30, 1951) is an American actor.

Select filmography

Film

Television

Videogames

Audio books

References

External links
 

1951 births
People from New York City
Living people
American male film actors
American male television actors
American male video game actors